Preston Smith is an American blues singer-songwriter from Houston, Texas, most known for his original song "Oh, I Love You So", which he performed for the movie, Cocktail, starring Tom Cruise.

References

External links

Year of birth missing (living people)
Place of birth missing (living people)
Living people
American blues singer-songwriters
Singer-songwriters from Texas
Musicians from Houston